United Nations Security Council Resolution 1838 is a United Nations Security Council resolution that calls on nations with vessels in the Somali piracy region to apply military force as a means of repressing acts of piracy.  Adopted unanimously on October 7, 2008, it recommends that states commit both naval and air forces to fight this crime. The text was drafted by French authorities.

References

External links 

 Text of the Resolution at undocs.org
 

Piracy in Somalia
Transport in Somalia
 1838
 1838
2008 in Somalia
October 2008 events